Larsen Bay Airport  is a state-owned public-use airport located in Larsen Bay, a city in the Kodiak Island Borough of the U.S. state of Alaska.

As per Federal Aviation Administration records, the airport had 1,700 passenger boardings (enplanements) in calendar year 2022. It is included in the National Plan of Integrated Airport Systems for 2011–2015, which categorized it as a non-primary commercial service airport (between 2,500 and 10,000 enplanements per year).

Facilities and aircraft 
Larsen Bay Airport resides at elevation of 87 feet (27 m) above mean sea level. It has one runway designated 4/22 with a gravel surface measuring 2,690 by 75 feet (820 x 23 m). For the 12-month period ending December 31, 2006, the airport had 3,730 aircraft operations, an average of 10 per day: 52% air taxi and 48% general aviation.

Airline and destinations 

Airlines with scheduled passenger service to non-stop destinations:

Statistics

References

External links 
 Topographic map from USGS The National Map
 Airport diagram from FAA Alaska Region

Airports in Kodiak Island Borough, Alaska